Alhassan Yusuf Abdullahi (born 18 July 2000) is a Nigerian professional footballer who plays as a midfielder for Belgian First Division A club Royal Antwerp.

Career

IFK Göteborg 
From 2018 to 2021, Yusuf played for Allsvenskan club IFK Göteborg.

Antwerp 
On 16 July 2021, Belgian club Antwerp announced that they had reached an oral agreement with IFK Göteborg over the transfer of Yusuf.

Honours
Individual
Allsvenskan Newcomer of the Year: 2019

References

External links
 
 

2000 births
Living people
Sportspeople from Kano
Nigerian footballers
Association football midfielders
IFK Göteborg players
Royal Antwerp F.C. players
Allsvenskan players
Belgian Pro League players
Nigerian expatriate footballers
Expatriate footballers in Sweden
Expatriate footballers in Belgium

Nigerian expatriate sportspeople in Sweden